Vennila Kabadi Kuzhu is a 2009 Indian Tamil-language sports drama film written and directed by newcomer Susindran, starring debutant Vishnu Vishal, Kishore, and Saranya Mohan along with numerous other newcomers. The music was composed by V. Selvaganesh with cinematography by Laxman Kumar and editing by Kasi Viswanathan. The film released on 29 January 2009.

The movie was later remade in Telugu as Bheemili Kabaddi Jattu in the year 2010 with Nani and Saranya Mohan in the lead and also in Hindi as Badlapur Boys in the year 2014 with Nishan and Saranya Mohan in the lead. A spiritual successor, Vennila Kabaddi Kuzhu 2, was released in 2019.

Plot

The story unfolds in a remote village near Palani called Kanakkanpatti with a poor goat herd Marimuthu (Vishnu Vishal) as its protagonist who lost education as his father died when he was 13. He also plays kabbadi very well. Marimuthu, along with his childhood friends Ayyappan (Hari Vairavan), Sekar (Nitish Veera), Murthy (Maayi Sundar), Appukutty (Appukutty), Subramani (Soori), and Pandi (Ramesh Pandiyan), are kabbadi players who dream of winning a local tournament.

Sekar is a rich, short-tempered rice mill owner and is always captain of the team. Appukutty is a short tea shop owner who often gets heavy scoldings from his old mother-in-law. Subramani is a newlywed man who has only three hobbies: eating thrice as normal, playing kabbadi, and making love. Pandi is a fat local store owner who is the son of an ex-army man. Marimuthu works in a farm and can stay in his house only during holidays. Their kabbadi team, Vennila Kabadi Kuzhu, is infamous for never winning a match in their history. In a subplot, Marimuthu meets and flirts with an unnamed beautiful young lady (Saranya Mohan) who comes visiting to his village's annual festival. They organize a friendly kabbadi match with the neighboring village team for the festival, and Souda Muthu (Kishore), the coach of the state's best kabbadi team, is the chief guest in which an outbreak in the game occurs. They then go to Madurai for a non-detail known match where Souda Muthu is one of the chief conductors and a coach. He tells it is a state-level pre-qualified tournament in which no local teams may participate. As they prepare to leave, they learn that suddenly their district team has forfeited, and hence they join unopposed as Dindigul district team.

Souda Muthu wants to give a rookie substitute of his team (the Paper Mills team, which has won the last two seasons) into playing seven, but the rest of the team rebel and expel Souda Muthu from coaching them. Then, Souda Muthu separates from his state winning team and starts coaching Vennila. The team progresses through the tournament into the final despite the myriad hurdles and disadvantages, with the help of their coach, who gives them very hard coaching.

In the semifinals, the opposite team tries to injure Marimuthu and win the game. They succeed in dislocating his collarbone, and Marimuthu is hospitalized. The rest of team ensures that they win by a very huge margin, including a brutal offence attack. Though the collarbone is relocated, Marimuthu must remain in the hospital for the night.

The finals between the teams Vennila and Paper Mills causes high anticipations as one is the defending champion and the other is an unknown rookie. The betting bookie fears that Vennila might win. Hence, they poison Sekar's mind stating that Railways will choose one player from each finalists, and he must prevent Marimuthu from playing in finals to get the job for himself. Sekar attempts to do so minutes before the finals, but the coach and team turn on him, and he is expelled before the match. The whole of the village has come to watch their match, except Marimuthu's mother.

In the final, the Vennila team struggles initially but manages to fight back into contention in the second half. As the game ends in a tie, players from each team go up individually against each other as a tiebreaker. Both teams score equal points, and only one upon each side remains. Marimuthu is to be the defense, when the opposite raider (Vijay Sethupathi) has the last raid. The raider attempts to touch Marimuthu by kicking lightly on his chest and coming back, but Marimuthu comes forward and holds his leg, they both fall down, and the raider is prevented from touching the line within the time period. Hence, Marimuthu wins the game for the Vennila team, and they become the first rookie state champions.

The scene changes to several months later when Marimuthu's love interest returns to the village festival where she met Marimuthu the previous year, but he is nowhere to be found. It is revealed later that Marimuthu died as his heart stopped due to the sudden shock he received when the opposite player kicked him in his chest and both fell down. However, his friends, despite noticing her search for him, decide not to reveal to her Marimuthu's demise to spare her the anguish. The movie ends ambiguously, with the lady leaving the village without knowing Marimuthu's fate. With the final shot showing that his mother was still in the pain of her son's death.

Cast

  Vishnu Vishal as Marimuthu
  Kishore as Souda Muthu
  Saranya Mohan as Marimuthu's love interest
  Soori as Subramani
  Appukutty as Appukutty
  Srithika
  Murugadoss
  Nitish Veera as Sekar
  Maayi Sundar as Murthy
  Hari Vairavan as Ayyappan
  Ramesh Pandiyan as Pandi
  Muthu K Kumaran as Kalimuthu
  Vijay Sethupathi as Kabaddi player 
  B. Neelan
  Chandraprakash
  Janaki

Production
According to director Suseenthiran, the film is based on real life incidents as his father was a kabbadi player. Suseenthiran got to know about the insults and pains the player went through, which he wanted to showcase in a film. Also, he was said to be inspired from success of the 2001 Bollywood film Lagaan, which was based on cricket.

Soundtrack

The songs were penned by Na. Muthukumar, Francis Kriba, Snehan, and Karthik Netha and composed by V. Selvaganesh.

Reception
Rediff wrote "With its superb ensemble cast and script, Vennila Kabaddi Kuzhu scores the match-point". Sify wrote "The film has a tight script but does not break new ground, nor does it tell a dramatically different story. But what it does have is a very clean screenplay with all the typical elements of a good sports film in place".

Box office
The film was successful at the box office.

References

External links
 

2009 films
Indian sports drama films
2000s sports drama films
Films directed by Suseenthiran
Tamil films remade in other languages
2000s Tamil-language films
Films scored by V. Selvaganesh
Sports films based on actual events
2009 directorial debut films
2009 drama films
Kabaddi in India